Senoculus is a genus of araneomorph spiders in the family Senoculidae, and was first described by Władysław Taczanowski in 1872. It is the only genus in the family Senoculidae.

Species
 it contains thirty-one species, found in South America, Guatemala, Panama, Mexico, and on Trinidad:
Senoculus albidus (F. O. Pickard-Cambridge, 1897) – Brazil
Senoculus barroanus Chickering, 1941 – Panama
Senoculus bucolicus Chickering, 1941 – Panama
Senoculus cambridgei Mello-Leitão, 1927 – Brazil
Senoculus canaliculatus F. O. Pickard-Cambridge, 1902 – Mexico to Panama
Senoculus carminatus Mello-Leitão, 1927 – Brazil
Senoculus darwini (Holmberg, 1883) – Argentina
Senoculus fimbriatus Mello-Leitão, 1927 – Brazil
Senoculus gracilis (Keyserling, 1879) – Guyana to Argentina
Senoculus guianensis Caporiacco, 1947 – Guyana
Senoculus iricolor (Simon, 1880) – Brazil
Senoculus maronicus Taczanowski, 1872 (type) – French Guiana
Senoculus minutus Mello-Leitão, 1927 – Brazil
Senoculus monastoides (O. Pickard-Cambridge, 1873) – Brazil
Senoculus nigropurpureus Mello-Leitão, 1927 – Paraguay
Senoculus penicillatus Mello-Leitão, 1927 – Trinidad, Brazil, Paraguay
Senoculus planus Mello-Leitão, 1927 – Brazil
Senoculus plumosus (Simon, 1880) – Brazil
Senoculus prolatus (O. Pickard-Cambridge, 1896) – Mexico, Guatemala
Senoculus proximus Mello-Leitão, 1927 – Brazil
Senoculus purpureus (Simon, 1880) – Panama to Argentina
Senoculus robustus Chickering, 1941 – Panama
Senoculus rubicundus Chickering, 1953 – Panama
Senoculus rubromaculatus Keyserling, 1879 – Peru
Senoculus ruficapillus (Simon, 1880) – Brazil
Senoculus scalarum Schiapelli & Gerschman, 1958 – Argentina
Senoculus silvaticus Chickering, 1941 – Panama
Senoculus tigrinus Chickering, 1941 – Panama
Senoculus uncatus Mello-Leitão, 1927 – Brazil
Senoculus wiedenmeyeri Schenkel, 1953 – Venezuela
Senoculus zeteki Chickering, 1953 – Panama

See also
 List of Senoculidae species

References

Araneomorphae genera
Senoculidae